Firuzabad (also Romanized as Fīrūzābād; also known as Kalāteh-ye Fīrūzābād) is a village in Quchan Atiq Rural District, in the Central District of Quchan County, Razavi Khorasan Province, Iran. At the 2006 census, its population was 684, in 160 families.

References 

Populated places in Quchan County